Dorycephalus is a genus of leafhoppers in the subfamily Deltocephalinae. It is the only genus in the tribe Dorycephalini. There are currently only two described species in the genus. The members of the genus are found in eastern Europe, Russia and Mongolia.

Species 
There are currently 2 described species in Dorycephalus:

 Dorycephalus baeri 
 Dorycephalus hunnorum

References 

Cicadellidae genera
Taxa described in 1866
Deltocephalinae